Paraneoplastic antigen Ma2 is a protein that in humans is encoded by the PNMA2 gene.

References

Further reading